Usta biplaga is a species of moth in the family Saturniidae. It is found in south-western Africa.

Taxonomy
Usta biplaga is treated as a subspecies, form or synonym of Usta wallengrenii by some sources.

References

Moths described in 1912
biplaga